Alberto Giuliani (born 25 December 1964) is an Italian professional volleyball coach. He is the current head coach of the Turkey national team and the Greek team, Olympiacos.

Personal life
His son, Ludovico (born 1998) is a volleyball player, playing as a libero.

Honours

Clubs
 CEV Cup
  2009/2010 – with Bre Banca Lannutti Cuneo

 CEV Challenge Cup
  2022/2023 – with Olympiacos

 National championships
 2009/2010  Italian Championship, with Bre Banca Lannutti Cuneo
 2010/2011  Italian SuperCup, with Bre Banca Lannutti Cuneo
 2010/2011  Italian Cup, with Bre Banca Lannutti Cuneo
 2011/2012  Italian Championship, with Lube Banca Marche Macerata
 2012/2013  Italian SuperCup, with Cucine Lube Banca Marche Macerata
 2013/2014  Italian Championship, with Cucine Lube Banca Marche Macerata
 2014/2015  Italian SuperCup, with Cucine Lube Banca Marche Treia
 2018/2019  Turkish SuperCup, with Halkbank Ankara

References

External links

 
 Coach profile at LegaVolley.it 
 Coach profile at Volleybox.net

Living people
1964 births
Sportspeople from the Province of Macerata
Italian volleyball coaches
Volleyball coaches of international teams
Italian expatriate sportspeople in Slovakia
Italian expatriate sportspeople in Turkey
Italian expatriate sportspeople in Slovenia
Italian expatriate sportspeople in Poland
Italian expatriate sportspeople in Greece
Resovia (volleyball) coaches
Olympiacos S.C. coaches